Maneater is an action role-playing game developed and published by Tripwire Interactive. In the game, the player assumes control of a female bull shark who must evolve and survive in an open world so she can take revenge on a fisherman who disfigured her as a pup and killed her mother.

Maneater was released for Windows, PlayStation 4, and Xbox One in May 2020, for Xbox Series X/S and PlayStation 5 in November, and for Nintendo Switch in May 2021. A downloadable content pack for the game, Truth Quest, was released in August 2021. Set after the main story, Truth Quest follows the shark as it travels to a mysterious experiment site and confronts a radioactive monster causing chaos around Port Clovis.

Gameplay
The game is an action role-playing game played from a third-person perspective. In the game, the player assumes control of a baby bull shark who must take revenge on a shark hunter named Scaly Pete, who killed its mother and disfigured it. The shark has several basic attacks, including charging into enemies, siloing out of the water and whipping enemies with its tail to stun them. It can also use its surroundings for combat advantages, such as using a swordfish as a spear. The shark needs to hunt and consume other aquatic wildlife such as fish and turtles in order to obtain nutrients, namely proteins, fats, minerals and rare mutagenics. Players can also attack humans by wreaking havoc along the coast, destroying yachts and ships, and knocking people off jet skis. As the player gains enough nutrients, the shark must enter underwater grottos to unlock new abilities and increase in size, which allows the shark to take on larger and deadlier creatures. The shark will slowly evolve into an adult "mega" shark, and players can acquire advanced upgrades and customization options such as external bone plates, shadow armor, and electromagnetic spikes to further enhance the shark's combat abilities.

Playing as the shark, players can freely explore the open world of Port Clovis, which consists of eight regions: Caviar Keys, Crawfish Bay, Dead Horse Lake, Fawtick Bayou, Golden Shores, Prosperity Sands, Sapphire Bay, and the Gulf. Players can discover hidden landmarks and complete side objectives. While each region will have other predators that will attack the player, such as muskellunge, barracuda, alligators, sperm whales, orcas, and even other sharks, they will also have their own apex predator, which is larger, and differing in appearance than their normal species. The apex predators are a great barracuda, a shortfin mako, an American alligator, a great hammerhead, a great white, an orca, and an albino sperm whale. Defeating these predators will earn the player special skills. As the shark creates more havoc, the world will react by dispatching human bounty hunters to hunt it down. If the shark manages to kill the ten lead hunters, which are named characters, it will receive additional rewards. The game is narrated by Trip Westhaven (voiced by Chris Parnell), the host of an in-game reality TV show titled Maneaters vs. Sharkhunters, who guides the player throughout the game.

Plot
A film crew for a reality television show follows experienced Cajun shark hunter Pierre "Scaly Pete" LeBlanc (Carlo Mestroni) and his son Kyle (Raphael Grosz-Harvey) as they hunt for an adult bull shark with a harpoon in its side owned by Scaly Pete's father. They manage to capture the shark after it goes on a killing spree at a beach. Upon discovering that the bull shark is pregnant, the film crew is shocked when Scaly Pete cuts out the infant shark and uses his knife to identify it later as it grows before letting it go, though he loses his right hand in the process.

The infant shark grows larger over time by eating fish, aquatic mammals and reptiles, humans, and apex predators. Other shark hunters eventually go after the shark, but are also killed and eaten. Back on Scaly Pete's boat, the Cajun Queen, tensions grow between him and his son over claims that Scaly Pete's father was killed by a megalodon, even though it is believed to have been extinct for over two million years. They eventually relocate the shark and attempt to kill it. They try burning the shark alive after it eats Scaly Pete's left leg, but the shark escapes, and Kyle is killed in an explosion that causes the Cajun Queen to sink and leaves Scaly Pete disfigured.

As the shark continues to grow, the film crew grows concerned for Scaly Pete's sanity after losing Kyle as he prepares to use extreme methods to kill the shark. He eventually repairs and arms his father's old PT 522 navy patrol boat with military-grade firepower. The shark ultimately gets the upper hand on Scaly Pete, who in a last-ditch effort, plans to use explosives to kill himself and the shark. While Scaly Pete dies in the explosion, the Shark ultimately survives and retreats to an underwater cave to recover.

Truth Quest
Having survived its battle with Scaly Pete, the shark senses the presence of another, more sinister apex predator that threatens her current status. Discovering radioactive chemicals left behind by the unknown predator around Port Clovis, the shark ventures to Plover Island, also known as "Site P", which is said to be an off-the-books experimental station. Upon arriving, the shark attacks the island's technology and hunt new wildlife, hunters, and mutated predators that have developed abilities such as bio-electricity, shadow set, bone armor, and the ability to emit radiation.

Amidst its attacks and its transformation into an irradiated mutant however, the shark unknowingly releases the apex predator, a mosasaur-like leviathan called M.O.L.O.C.H., which escapes to Port Clovis and attacks several settlements. The shark eventually faces and kills M.O.L.O.C.H. in battle before returning to Plover Island, only for the entire facility to be destroyed in an explosion.

Development
The game was developed by Blindside Interactive alongside publisher Tripwire Interactive. The game's production was led by Alex Quick, who worked on the competitive multiplayer game Depth in which players assume control of either a shark or a diver as they combat each other. Initially envisioned as an expansion for Depth, the title became a standalone product after members of the development team splintered off and worked on a single-player experience that builds on the gameplay systems established by Depth. The team was inspired by Jaws Unleashed and other action RPGs such as Deus Ex and Dishonored while working on the title. According to John Gibson, the president of Tripwire, the team had always wanted to make an open world title similar to games like Far Cry and The Legend of Zelda: Breath of the Wild, though the team wanted their take on the genre to be "completely new and unique". The combat system was inspired by Punch Out and Dark Souls, as the player needs to think tactically and discern an opponent's attack pattern.

Maneater was announced in June 2018 by Tripwire's newly formed publishing division which provided funding, marketing and additional development for the game. The game's physical retail version is published by Deep Silver. The first trailer for the game was shown at E3 2018 during the PC Gaming Show. Maneater was released worldwide for Microsoft Windows via the Epic Games Store, PlayStation 4 and Xbox One on May 22, 2020. The Nintendo Switch version was originally planned for release in 2020, but was later delayed to May 25, 2021.

DLC
So far, two DLCs for Maneater have been released. On August 20, 2020, Maneater released its first DLC known as Tiger Shark Skin, which gives the shark a red colored body with blue stripes. This evolution allows the player to collect more nutrients from wildlife, hunters, and nutrient caches.

A second DLC of Maneater, known as Truth Quest, which features the return of narrator Trip Westhaven as well as new regions, side challenges, hunter vehicles and bounty hunters, wildlife, and evolution sets as well as another story arc and the shark increasing in size, was in the works. At first, it was thought to be an April Fool's joke until Tripwire Interactive gave assurance that it wasn't. The official release date for Truth Quest was August 31, 2021.

Reception

Maneater received "mixed or average" reviews according to the review aggregator Metacritic. PC Gamer criticized the repetitive gameplay. IGN also criticized the repetition, especially with the game's approximate length of 15 hours, but praised the premise.  Screen Rant complimented the B movie stylization of the game.

References

External links
 

2020 video games
Action role-playing video games
Deep Silver games
Majesco Entertainment games
Nintendo Switch games
Open-world video games
PlayStation 4 games
PlayStation 5 games
Shark attacks in fiction
Single-player video games
Unreal Engine games
Video games about animals
Video games about evolution
Video games about food and drink
Video games developed in the United States
Video games featuring female protagonists
Video games with underwater settings
Windows games
Xbox One games
Xbox Series X and Series S games
Tripwire Interactive games